Robert Mills Gagné (August 21, 1916 – April 28, 2002) was an American educational psychologist best known for his Conditions of Learning. He pioneered the science of instruction during World War II when he worked with the Army Air Corps training pilots. He went on to develop a series of studies and works that simplified and explained what he and others believed to be "good instruction." Gagné was also involved in applying concepts of instructional theory to the design of computer-based training and multimedia-based learning.
His work is sometimes summarized as the Gagné assumption: that different types of learning exist, and that different instructional conditions are most likely to bring about these different types of learning.

Biography

Early life and education 
Robert Mills Gagné was born on August 21, 1916 in North Andover, Massachusetts. In high school, he decided to study psychology and perhaps be a psychologist after reading psychological texts. In his valedictory speech of 1932, Gagné professed that the science of psychology should be used to relieve the burdens of human life.

Gagné received a scholarship to Yale University, where he earned his A.B. in 1937. He then went on to receive his Sc.M. and Ph.D. at Brown University where he studied the "conditioned operate response" of white rats as part of his thesis.

Career 
His first college teaching job was in 1940, at Connecticut College for Women.

His initial studies of people rather than rats were interrupted by World War II. In the first year of war, at Psychological Research Unit No. 1, Maxwell Field, Alabama, he administered and scored aptitude tests to choose and sort aviation cadets. Thereafter, he was assigned to officer school in Miami Beach. He was commissioned a second lieutenant, and assigned to School of Aviation Medicine, Randolph Field, Fort Worth, Texas.

After the war, he held a temporary faculty position at Pennsylvania State University. He returned to Connecticut College for Women. In 1949, he accepted an offer to join the US Air Force organization that became the Air Force Personnel and Training Research Center, where he was research director of the Perceptual and Motor Skills Laboratory. In 1958, he returned to academia as professor at Princeton University, where his research shifted focus to the learning of problem solving and the learning of mathematics. In 1962, he joined the American Institutes for Research, where he wrote his first book, Conditions of Learning. He spent additional time in academia at the University of California, Berkeley, where he worked with graduate students. With W. K. Roher, he presented a paper, "Instructional Psychology", to the Annual Review of Psychology.

In 1969, he found a lasting home at Florida State University. He collaborated with L. J. Briggs on Principles of Learning. He published the second and third editions of The Conditions of Learning.

Personal life
Gagné's wife, Pat, was a biologist. They had a son, Sam, and daughter, Ellen. His non-professional pursuits included constructing wood furniture and reading modern fiction. In 1993, he retired to Signal Mountain, Tennessee with his wife.

Learning process
Gagné's theory stipulates that there are several types and levels of learning, and each of these types and levels requires instruction that is tailored to meet the needs of the pupil. While Gagne's learning blueprint can cover all aspects of learning, the focus of the theory is on the retention and honing of intellectual skills. The theory has been applied to the design of instruction in all fields, though in its original formulation special attention was given to military training settings.

Each category requires different methods in order for the particular skill set to be learned.

Eight ways to learn

In 1956, based on the degree of complexity of the mental process, he suggested a system of analyzing different conditions or levels of learning from simple to complex. According to Gagné, the higher order of learning in the hierarchy is built upon the lower levels, requiring a greater amount of previous knowledge to progress successfully. This analyzes final capability into subordinate skills in an order such that the lower levels can be predicted for positive transfer of higher level learning. The lower four orders focus on the behavioral aspects of learning, while the higher four focus on the cognitive aspects. In his original study on instruction, through a study derived from an analysis of learning of a task of constructing formulas for the sums of number series, Gagné attributed individual differences or differences in intelligence in learning.

Steps of planning instruction
 Identify the types of learning outcomes: Each outcome may have prerequisite knowledge or skills that must be identified.
 Identify the internal conditions or processes the learner must have to achieve the outcomes.
 Identify the external conditions or instruction needed to achieve the outcomes.
 Specify the learning context.
 Record the characteristics of the learners.
 Select the media for instruction.
 Plan to motivate the learners.
 Test the instruction with learners in the form of formative evaluation.
 After the instruction has been used, summative evaluation is used to judge the effectiveness of the instruction.

Nine Events of Instruction
 Gain attention: Present stimulus to ensure reception of instruction.
 Tell the learners the learning objective: What will the pupil gain from the instruction?
 Stimulate recall of prior learning: Ask for recall of existing relevant knowledge.
 Present the stimulus: Display the content.
 Provide learning guidance
 Elicit performance: Learners respond to demonstrate knowledge.
 Provide feedback: Give informative feedback on the learner's performance.
 Assess performance: More performance and more feedback, to reinforce information.
 Enhance retention and transfer to other contexts

Evaluation of instruction
 Have the objectives been met?
 Is the new program better than the previous one?
 What additional effects does the new program include?

The purpose is to supply data on feasibility and efficiency to develop and improve the course.

Evaluation is concerned with the effectiveness of the course or program regarding the student’s performance. Based on the student's performance, measures are taken of the kind of student capabilities the program is intended to establish.

When objectively analyzing the condition for learning Gagné says, "Since the purpose of instruction is learning, the central focus for rational derivation of instructional techniques is the human learner.  Development of rationally sound instructional procedures must take into account learner characteristics such as initiate capacities, experimental maturity, and current knowledge states.  Such factors become parameters of the design of any particular program of instruction."

Awards
 Membership in Phi Beta Kappa, Sigma Xi, and the National Academy of Education
 Eminent Lectureship Award by the Society of Engineering Education
 Phi Delta Kappa Award for Distingued Educational Research
 E. L. Thorndike Award in Educational Psychology
 John Smyth Memorial Award from the Victorian Institute of Educational Research
 The Robert O. Lawton Distinguished Professorship, Florida State University'c highest award
 American Psychological Association Scientific Award for Applications of Psychology
 Educational Technology Person of the Year Award 
 AECT Outstanding Educator and Researcher Award

See also 
Instructional design#Robert Gagné

References

Further reading
 Richey, Rita C. (2000) The legacy of Robert M. Gagné
 Gagne, R.M., Wager, W.W., Golas, K.C., and Keller, J.M. (2004). Principles of Instructional Design, 5th Edition.

External links 
 Conversation on Instructional Design Home (Gagné and Merrill video seminar) 
 Gagne's Four Phases of Instruction

20th-century American psychologists
Educational psychologists
American educational theorists
1916 births
2002 deaths
Yale University alumni
Brown University alumni
Princeton University faculty
Florida State University faculty
People from Signal Mountain, Tennessee